Maurice K. Zilkha (1918-1964) was an Iraqi banker.

Early life
Maurice Zilkha was born in Baghdad, Iraq, the son of Khedouri Zilkha and Louise (Bashi) Zilkha.

Career
He was managing director of Banque Zilkha in Egypt until the family's Egyptian assets were confiscated in 1956 by Gamel Abdel Nasser's government.

In 1956, Zilkha left from Egypt and became an Italian citizen. He died in 1964 at the Carlyle Hotel in New York City after a short illness.

Personal life
He was survived by his wife Helene Paraskeviadias Zilkha, their daughter Doris of Paris, France and Mont-sur-Rolle, Switzerland; their son, Philippe; as well as his three brothers and two sisters, Mrs. Helen Simon and Mrs. Hanina Shasha (wife of Alfred Aboud Shasha), both of New York.

References

1918 births
1964 deaths
Iraqi bankers
Iraqi Jews
People from Baghdad
Maurice
Iraqi expatriates in Egypt
Immigrants to Italy